Iulian Șerban (25 February 1985 – 6 January 2021) was a Romanian paracanoeist who competed from the late 2000s onwards. He won a gold medal in the K-1 200 m LTA event at the 2010 ICF Canoe Sprint World Championships in Poznań. 

Șerban was born in Olănești, Vâlcea County, and died in Bucharest at the age of 35 on 6 January 2021.

References

External links
 

1985 births
2021 deaths
Romanian male canoeists
Paracanoeists of Romania
ICF Canoe Sprint World Championships medalists in paracanoe
LTA classification paracanoeists
People from Vâlcea County
Place of birth missing